NGC 1955 (also known as ESO 56-SC121) is an open cluster associated with an emission nebula located in the Dorado constellation. This nebula is part of the H II region which is part of the Large Magellanic Cloud and was discovered by James Dunlop on August 3, 1826. Its apparent magnitude is 9.0, and its size is 1.8 arc minutes.

References

External links
 

Open clusters
emission nebulae
H II regions
Dorado (constellation)
Large Magellanic Cloud
ESO objects
1955
Astronomical objects discovered in 1826
Discoveries by James Dunlop